The 2014 Indonesia Open was the seventh super series tournament of the 2014 BWF Super Series. The tournament took place in Jakarta, Indonesia from 17–22 June 2014 with a total purse of $750,000.

Men's singles

Seeds 

  Lee Chong Wei (semifinals)
  Chen Long (semifinals)
  Jan Ø. Jørgensen (champions)
  Kenichi Tago (final)
  Tommy Sugiarto (first round)
  Du Pengyu (withdrew)
  Shon Wan-ho (quarterfinals)
  Boonsak Ponsana (first round)

Top half

Bottom half

Finals

Women's singles

Seeds 

  Li Xuerui (champions)
  Wang Shixian (semifinals)
  Wang Yihan (second round)
  Ratchanok Intanon (final)
  Sung Ji-hyun (second round)
  Bae Yeon-ju (quarterfinals)
  Tai Tzu-ying (second round)
  Saina Nehwal (quarterfinals)

Top half

Bottom half

Finals

Men's doubles

Seeds 

  Mohammad Ahsan / Hendra Setiawan (final)
  Mathias Boe / Carsten Mogensen (second round)
  Hiroyuki Endo / Kenichi Hayakawa (first round)
  Kim Ki-jung / Kim Sa-rang (semifinals)
  Lee Sheng-mu / Tsai Chia-hsin (quarterfinals)
  Lee Yong-dae / Yoo Yeon-seong (champions)
  Liu Xiaolong / Qiu Zihan (quarterfinals)
  Gideon Markus Fernaldi / Markis Kido (quarterfinals)

Top half

Bottom half

Finals

Women's doubles

Seeds 

  Bao Yixin / Tang Jinhua (withdrew)
  Christinna Pedersen / Kamilla Rytter Juhl (quarterfinals)
  Wang Xiaoli / Yu Yang (withdrew)
  Misaki Matsutomo / Ayaka Takahashi (second round)
  Jang Ye-na / Kim So-young (semifinals)
  Reika Kakiiwa / Miyuki Maeda (second round)
  Nitya Krishinda Maheswari / Greysia Polii (second round)
  Tian Qing / Zhao Yunlei (champions)

Top half

Bottom half

Finals

Mixed doubles

Seeds 

  Zhang Nan / Zhao Yunlei (first round)
  Tontowi Ahmad / Lilyana Natsir (semifinals)
  Xu Chen / Ma Jin (final)
  Joachim Fischer Nielsen / Christinna Pedersen (champions)
  Chris Adcock / Gabrielle Adcock (quarterfinals)
  Markis Kido / Pia Zebadiah Bernadeth (first round)
  Sudket Prapakamol / Saralee Thoungthongkam (first round)
  Ko Sung-hyun / Kim Ha-na (quarterfinals)

Top half

Bottom half

Finals

References 

Indonesia
2014 in Indonesian sport
Sports competitions in Jakarta
Indonesia Open (badminton)